The following is a list of recurring Saturday Night Live characters and sketches introduced between September 29, 2001, and May 18, 2002, the twenty-seventh season of SNL.

Donatella Versace
Maya Rudolph parodies fashion designer Donatella Versace. Debuted September 29, 2001.

Gay Hitler

Gay Hitler (Chris Kattan) was a character loosely based on a theory described in German historian Lothar Machtan's book The Hidden Hitler, which attempts to prove that Adolf Hitler was a homosexual. The flamboyant Hitler character was known for the catchphrase "Sprechen Sie dick?"  Gay Hitler was the author of the fictional autobiography Mein Boyfriend, a satire of Hitler's actual autobiography Mein Kampf. Gay Hitler also appeared as Speed Skating Hitler, rendering the Sieg Heil salute repeatedly as he skated in place. Debuted October 13, 2001.

A scene in the film Step Brothers shows fellow SNL cast member Will Ferrell dressed as a Nazi asking the antagonist "Sprechen sie dick?".

Nicole, The Girl With No Gaydar
A Rachel Dratch sketch. Debuted November 3, 2001.

America Undercover
An HBO show, similar to Fox's COPS series, where a white trash couple (played by Amy Poehler and Chris Kattan) fist fight and police (or other authority figures) are called in to break them up. Debuted November 3, 2001.

Drunk Girl
Drunk Girl was played by Jeff Richards between 2001 and 2003. Her eyes are always squinted shut and she has shoulder-length blonde hair, and often a bared midriff. Debuted December 8, 2001.

Drunk Girl tends to do certain things while drunk:
tells people to "shut up!", whether they have actually said anything or not
asks people if they want to know something repeatedly, even after they say no, slurring the words more and more as she repeats the phrase. (During the Weekend Update Halftime Special, even though Jimmy Fallon said he wanted to know, she continued to repeat the phrase anyway.)
bursts into tears for no reason
acts sexually promiscuous; also takes off her bra and/or lets something inappropriate, such as food, fall out of it in later episodes
falls out of chairs frequently in later episodes

Astronaut Jones
A Tracy Morgan sketch. Debuted February 2, 2002.

The Leather Man
A Jimmy Fallon sketch. Debuted February 2, 2002.

Amber, the One-Legged Hypoglycemic
An Amy Poehler sketch. Debuted March 2, 2002.  Amber was "rockin' one leg" (as she described it) -Poehler held one leg up behind her body so it would appear to have been amputated at the knee.  She was impatient, bitchy, vulgar, dirty (literally "dirty" in that her clothes were covered with grime and she appeared not to bathe very often), and just generally obnoxious and gross.  She saw herself as extremely sexy and desirable.  Her catchphrase was, "Yeah, I farted. Jealous?!"  Occasionally, another similarly boorish behavior would be substituted for "I farted".  Apparently due to hypoglycemia, she would continuously munch on some unhealthy snack, usually a fatty fried food like french fries or potato chips throughout each sketch.  The male characters in each sketch tended to appreciate her self-confidence, but fell well short of agreeing that she was sexy or desirable.  She would never win the various beauty/popularity based contests that she would enter.

Appearances:

Mar. 2, 2002: Host Jonny Moseley.  Amber and her equally obnoxious frenemy (Maya Rudolph) vie for the affections of a goofy young man (Moseley).
May 18, 2002:  Host Winona Ryder.  Amber auditions to be a Playboy centerfold.
Nov. 2, 2002: Host Eric McCormack.  Amber is a contestant on The Bachelor.
May. 15, 2004: Host Mary-Kate and Ashley Olsen.  Amber appears on The Swan.  While the other contestants on the show got radical plastic surgery makeovers (as was typical of that show), they essentially did nothing for Amber (which was OK with her, as she saw herself as perfect already).  The Olsen twins appeared as another contestant, and that contestant's reflection in a mirror.
May. 21, 2005: Host Lindsay Lohan. Amber is a contestant on America's Next Top Model.
Feb. 23, 2008: Host Tina Fey.  Amber competes to become Bret Michaels' (played by Jason Sudeikis) wife on a reality program.
Sep. 25, 2010:  Host Amy Poehler.  Amber gets her own reality show on Showtime.

The Ferey Muhtar Talk Show
The Ferey Muthar Talk Show was a very short-lived sketch on SNL, appearing only twice (season 27 on the March 16, 2002, episode hosted by Ian McKellen and again on the season 28 episode hosted by Nia Vardalos). It was a talk show from Turkey, with Horatio Sanz as the host and Darrell Hammond as his sidekick. It was a parody based on Turkish reality show Ateş Hattı by Reha Muhtar.

References

Lists of recurring Saturday Night Live characters and sketches
Saturday Night Live in the 2000s
Saturday Night Live
Saturday Night Live